Luis Edgar Espinosa Sepúlveda (born November 17, 1967 in San Mateo, Boyacá) is a retired male road cyclist from Colombia, who was a professional from 1992 to 1997.

Career

1991
2nd in General Classification Tour of Austria (AUT)
1992
2nd in  National Championships, Road, Elite, Colombia (COL)
2nd in General Classification Vuelta a Colombia (COL)
1st in General Classification Vuelta a Costa Rica (CRC)
1994
12th in General Classification Vuelta a España (ESP)
2000
1st in Stage 8 Clásico RCN, Bogotà (COL)
2001
7th in General Classification Vuelta a Venezuela (VEN)

References
 

1967 births
Living people
Colombian male cyclists
Sportspeople from Boyacá Department